"Black & White" is a song by British singer and songwriter Natalie Duncan. The single is taken from the EP Black & White. The single was released to Spotify on 2 February 2015. It is due for release on iTunes on 23 February (with the EP being released in March). Compared to Duncan's previous releases this single features a more electronic feel and instrumentation.

Video

A video for the song has been filmed and is due for release in February.

References

External links
 Official web site

2014 songs
2015 singles